Break the Border (stylized as BREAK the BORDER) is the debut album by Swedish singer of English/Japanese/Swedish music Yohio. 
The original press was initially released on Sweden, 27 March 2013 with a limited number of tracks all sang in English. The Japanese edition was released in Japan on 15 May 2013 with all songs sang in Japanese and one exclusive track featuring Gackt.

The album contains "Heartbreak Hotel", the song Yohio performed in Melodifestivalen 2013 in a bid to represent Sweden in the Eurovision Song Contest 2013 finishing second overall in the competition.

In June 2013, a Platinum Edition was released in Sweden with the tracks of the ordinary Swedish edition plus three more tracks. The album debuted at number 35 in the Swedish Albums Chart.

Track list

Charts
The album debuted at number 1 in the Swedish Albums Chart.

References 

2013 debut albums
Yohio albums